is a Japanese dark psychedelic rock band. This rock outfit, founded by guitarist Jutok Kaneko in the late 1970s, has released only a handful of recordings internationally, and scant more in their local Tokyo underground scene.

Kaneko died on January 24, 2007.

Line-up
The classic trio line-up that recorded the first album, and reformed in recent years was:
Jutok Kaneko (guitar, vocals)
Ikuro Takahashi (ex-High Rise, Fushitsusha) (drums)
Mick (bass, vocals)

Other members:
Hiroshi Yokoyama (synth, 1978-1979), 
Toshiko Watanabe (drums, 1979), 
Asahito Nanjo (bass, 1982-1983), 
Munehiro Narita (drums, 1982-1983), 
Atsushi Ishiguro (drums, 1983–84), 
Takahashi Ikurou (drums, 1989–90),
Hibari Nagao (drums, 1994-1997), 
Emily (bass), 
Sachiko (vocals, synth, bass, 1995-2003), 
Michinobu Matsubashi (drums, 2000-)

Discography
V.A., Heaven Tapes cassette (Heaven, 1979)
Kousokuya LP (Ray Night Music, 1991; CD reissue, PSF, 2003)
V.A., Tokyo Flashback (PSF, 1991)
V.A., Tokyo Flashback 2 (PSF, 1992)
Ray Night 1991-1992 Live (Forced Exposure, 1995)
The Dark Spot w/ Masayoshi Urabe (PSF, 1997)
Live Gyakuryu Kokuu (PSF, 2004)
First Live 1979 Kichijoji Minor (PSF, 2006)
Echoes From Deep Underground (Archive, 2007)

References
Interview. G-Modern, issue 17, 97-98 Winter. pp. 10–25. (Japanese)

Interview. Ongaku Otaku, issue 3, 1998. pp. 16–22. (English)

Stofer, F. (2000). Japanese Independent Music, France: Sonore. 

Kosakai, F. "金子寿徳：彼方の柱廊を逍遥する旅についての末完の調書" (Jutok Kaneko: An Incomplete Record of an Ambulatory Journey Down a Distant Colonnade). Liner-notes for Jutok Kaneko, Endless Ruins CD (PSF, 2001) (Japanese, contains a valuable, detailed history of Kousokuya)

Kosakai, F. "Kaneko Jutok - The Year Spent with Ray-Night". G-Modern, issue 22, 2001. pp. 50–51. (Japanese)

External links
Kousokuya Official Homepage
Photographs from the last gig by Kousokuya, Dec 5th, 2006
Dusted magazine review
Kousokuya CDs for sale at Forced Exposure
Kousokuya CDs for sale at Midheaven
Kousokuya CDs for sale at Volcanic Tongue

Japanese rock music groups
P.S.F. Records artists